John Joseph Glynn (August 6, 1926 – August 23, 2004) was a Catholic American bishop who served the Archdiocese for the Military Services.

Biography
Born in Boston, Massachusetts, he was ordained a priest for the Archdiocese of Boston on April 11, 1951.

Glynn was appointed auxiliary bishop of the Roman Catholic Archdiocese for the Military Services, USA on December 10, 1991, and was consecrated on January 6, 1992.

Bishop Glynn retired on August 13, 2002.

See also

 Catholic Church hierarchy
 Catholic Church in the United States
 Historical list of the Catholic bishops of the United States
 Insignia of Chaplain Schools in the US Military
 List of Catholic bishops of the United States
 List of Catholic bishops of the United States: military service
 Lists of patriarchs, archbishops, and bishops
 Military chaplain
 Religious symbolism in the United States military
 United States military chaplains

References

External links
 Archdiocese for the Military Services, USA, official website
 Archdiocese for the Military Services of the United States. GCatholic.org. Retrieved 2010-08-20.
Roman Catholic Archdiocese of Boston

Episcopal succession

Clergy from Boston
20th-century Roman Catholic bishops in the United States
21st-century Roman Catholic bishops in the United States
1926 births
2004 deaths
American military chaplains